is the fourth greatest hits album by Japanese singer-songwriter Mai Kuraki. It was released on 25 October 2017 by Northern Music, in celebration of Kuraki's long-time collaboration with the Japanese animation Case Closed. The album features all the songs Kuraki had written for the animation.

Chart performance
In Japan, the album debuted at number four on the Oricon Weekly Albums Chart, selling 25,819 copies in its first week. The album also debuted at number four on the Billboard Japan Hot Albums Chart. The album was announced as Japanese 86th biggest selling album of the year.

The first single from Mai Kuraki x Meitantei Conan Collaboration Best 21: Shinjitsu wa Itsumo Uta ni Aru!, "Togetsukyo (Kimi Omou)" was released in April 2017 and peaked at number two on the Billboard Japan Hot 100 chart. The song has sold over 250,000 download copies and 76,146 physical copies, making it her best-selling CD single in decade and most downloaded song in her career.

Track listing

Detective Conan theme songs in media
"Secret of my heart" was used as 9th ending theme
"Start in my life" was used as 11th ending theme
"Always" was used as 12th ending theme and as theme song for movie Detective Conan: Countdown to Heaven
"Winter Bells" was used as 10th opening theme
"Time After Time" was used as theme song for movie Detective Conan: Crossroad in the Ancient Capital
"Kaze no La La La" was used as 12th opening theme
"Growing of my heart" was used as 16th opening theme
"Shiroi Yuki" was used as 26th ending theme
"Ichibyou Goto ni Love for you" was used as 23rd opening theme
"Revive" was used as 25th opening theme
"Puzzle" was used as theme song for movie Detective Conan: The Raven Chaser
"Summer Time Gone" was used as 29th opening theme
"Tomorrow is the last time" was used as 36th ending theme
"Your Best Friend" was used as 40th ending theme
"Koi ni Koishite" was used as 43rd ending theme
"Try Again" was used as 35th opening theme
"Muteki na Heart" was used as 48th ending theme
"Dynamite" was used as 39th opening theme and theme song in TV special The Disappearance of Conan Edogawa: The Worst Two Days in History
"Sawage Life" was used as 52nd ending theme
"Yesterday Love" was used as 53rd ending theme
"Togetsukyo -Kimi Omou-" was used as 55th ending theme and theme song for movie Detective Conan: Crimson Love Letter

Charts

Daily charts

Weekly charts

Monthly charts

Yearly charts

Release history

References

External links
Mai Kuraki Official Website 
Detective Conan x Mai Kuraki Collaboration Website 

Mai Kuraki albums
2017 compilation albums
Japanese-language compilation albums
Being Inc. compilation albums
Albums produced by Daiko Nagato